USS Wainwright (Destroyer No. 62/DD-62) was a  built for the United States Navy prior to the American entry into World War I. The ship was the first U.S. Navy vessel named in honor of U.S. Navy officers Jonathan Wainwright, his cousin, Commander Richard Wainwright, and his son, Jonathan Wainwright, Jr..

Wainwright was laid down by the New York Shipbuilding of Camden, New Jersey, in September 1914 and launched in June of the following year. She was armed with four  guns and had eight 21 inch (533 mm) torpedo tubes.
			
After her May 1916 commissioning, Wainwright sailed in the Atlantic and the Caribbean. After the United States entered World War I in April 1917, Wainwright was part of the first U.S. destroyer squadron sent overseas. Patrolling the Irish Sea out of Queenstown, Ireland, Wainwright made several unsuccessful attacks on U-boats, and rescued survivors of several ships sunk by the German craft.

Upon returning to the United States after the war, Wainwright resumed operations with the destroyers of the Atlantic Fleet until May 1922, when she was decommissioned. In April 1926, Wainwright was transferred to the United States Coast Guard to help enforce Prohibition as a part of the "Rum Patrol". She operated under the name USCGC Wainwright (CG-24) until April 1934, when she was returned to the Navy. She was sold for scrap in August 1934.

Design and construction 
Construction of the vessel was awarded to New York Shipbuilding of Camden, New Jersey, which laid down her keel on 1 September 1914. Just over nine months later, on 12 June 1915, Wainwright was launched by sponsor Miss Evelyn Wainwright Turpin, a descendant of the ship's namesakes, Commodore Jonathan Wainwright (1821–1863), his cousin Richard Wainwright (1817–1862), and son Jonathan Wainwright, Jr. (1849–1870), all U.S. Navy officers that died while serving.

Wainwright had two Curtis steam turbines that drove her two screw propellers, and an additional steam turbine geared to one of the propeller shafts for cruising purposes.

Wainwright was also equipped with eight  torpedo tubes. The General Board of the United States Navy had called for two anti-aircraft guns for the Tucker-class ships, as well as provisions for laying up to 36 floating mines. From sources, it is unclear if these recommendations were followed for Wainwright or any of the other ships of the class.

Early career 
USS Wainwright was commissioned into the United States Navy on 12 May 1916 under the command of Lieutenant Fred H. Poteet. After fitting out at Philadelphia, the destroyer rounded Cape May on 20 June and headed for Newport, Rhode Island, to load torpedoes before joining Division 8 of the Atlantic Fleet Destroyer Flotilla. Following exercises near Eastport, Maine, she remained on the New England coast until mid-September when she headed south for gunnery tests and training off the Virginia capes. Upon the completion of a fortnight's gun drills, the ship then returned to Buzzard's Bay, Massachusetts, on 2 October. Later that month, Wainwright operated out of Newport, practiced torpedo tactics near Vineyard Sound, and visited New York to pick up cargo for the flotilla's tender, . She returned to Newport on the 18th and, eight days later, resumed torpedo practice near Vineyard Sound for the remainder of the month. She put into Boston, Massachusetts on 1 November for extensive repairs in the navy yard.

Refurbished, the destroyer got underway for the Caribbean on 8 January 1917. Steaming via Hampton Roads, Virginia, she reached Culebra Island, near Puerto Rico, on the 14th and conducted war games exercises with the Atlantic Fleet. In the course of those operations, she visited the Dominican Republic as well as Guantanamo Bay and Santiago in Cuba. Later that month, Wainwright carried Assistant Secretary of the Navy Franklin D. Roosevelt; Brigadier General George Barnett, the Commandant of the Marine Corps; and the Chairman of the Civil Service Commission from Santiago to Port-au-Prince, Haiti. Following that assignment, Wainwright conducted torpedo exercises, patrols, and power trials near Guantanamo Bay until the beginning of March.

She returned to Boston on 10 March for a short period in the Navy Yard. On 31 March, she departed Boston for Hampton Roads where she arrived on 2 April. The following morning, in response to the imminent threat of war with Germany, Wainwright began to search for submarines and to patrol Hampton Roads to protect the Fleet and naval bases. Two days later, other warships relieved her on patrol; and she anchored with the Fleet in the mouth of the York River. The next day, 6 April 1917, the United States entered World War I.

World War I 
By the spring of 1917, the unrestricted submarine warfare campaign—which Germany had launched at the beginning of February—had so succeeded that the entire Allied war effort was endangered. Strong reinforcements to the Allied antisubmarine forces were desperately needed to avert defeat and needed at once. In response to a request from the Royal Navy for the service of American antisubmarine warfare ships in European waters, the United States Navy began sending destroyers eastward across the Atlantic.

Wainwright again briefly patrolled Hampton Roads before heading for the New York Navy Yard on 14 April, and on to Boston, where she arrived two days later, to prepare for overseas duty. This division—led by Commander Joseph K. Taussig—was the first American naval unit to be sent to Europe. The destroyers reached Queenstown on the southern coast of Ireland on 4 May and, after fueling, began patrolling the southern approaches to Liverpool and other British ports on the coast of the Irish Sea.

Wainwright reported her first scrape with a German submarine on 11 May. She sighted an abandoned lifeboat at about 08:00. After investigating the drifting boat for occupants and finding none, she sank the boat with gunfire. At about 08:15, a lookout reported that a torpedo had missed the destroyer some  astern. Wainwright then fired several rounds from her  guns at what was thought to be a periscope. The supposed submarine disappeared soon thereafter; and, despite a thorough investigation of the area, the destroyer could turn up no more evidence of the presence of a U-boat.

The summer of 1917 provided few opportunities for Wainwright to test her sub-killing techniques. On 4 July, a member of the destroyer's crew spotted a purported periscope and soon thereafter others claimed that a torpedo was reported to have passed the ship,  astern. Wainwright depth-charged the last indicated position of the undersea raider but to no avail. On the morning of 20 August, after  brought up some oil with one of her depth charges, Wainwright dropped a couple of depth charges as she passed through the faint slick. A few minutes later, she joined other ships in some sporadic gunfire but failed to prove that a submarine was in the area.

The fall, on the other hand, brought Wainwright increased activity. After spending the first two weeks of September in repairs at Birkenhead, near Liverpool, she departed the yard at Laird Basin at about 07:00 on the 14th to return to Queenstown. Wainwright rang up full speed, made off for the reported location, and began a search for the U-boat in conjunction with a British dirigible and other surface units.

Wainwright charged to the attack, but the submarine submerged almost immediately. Upon reaching the spot where the submarine had been, the warship located an oil slick and began dropping depth charges which failed to achieve positive results. Approaching darkness and the necessity of escorting an Admiralty oiler forced Wainwright to break off her attack. After she shepherded the oiler to safety, she returned to the area of her attack and patrolled throughout the night, but the submarine had apparently retired from the neighborhood.

Four days later, while searching for a U-boat in the area of Conigbeg Rock, the destroyer received word that the Conigbeg Lightship had rescued survivors from a fishing vessel. Wainwright rendezvoused with the craft to interview the four seamen of the smack Our Bairns. They revealed that the U-boat—which turned out to be —was of the latest type Germany had in action. The destroyer relieved the lighthouse vessel of the four fishermen and continued the search until dusk, when she headed back to Queenstown to land the rescued men.

For a month, she carried on conducting routine patrols. Action finally came on the morning of 18 October, when Wainwright again received orders to Helvick Head to hunt for an enemy submarine. She arrived at the designated location at about 11:15 and searched for more than two hours for clues as to the U-boat's location. The enemy appeared to be maneuvering into position for a torpedo attack but submerged the moment Wainwright charged to the attack. When the destroyer reached the estimated location of the U-boat, she dropped a depth charge and then a buoy to mark the spot. Having found nothing by 04:00 the following morning, she gave up and shaped a course for Queenstown.

The ensuing six months brought no new encounters with U-boats. She scouted areas where submarines had been reported but neither sighted nor engaged the enemy. On one occasion, she collided with a merchantman, and had to enter the drydock at Spencer Jetty that same day, 24 November 1917, for repairs.

While steaming generally south on 29 April 1918, she sighted a sail bearing almost due west whose hull was down below the horizon. By the time the destroyer had swung around to an intercepting course, the sail had disappeared. While the destroyer steamed toward the estimated position of the sail, she searched for evidence of a submarine. After covering  westward, she came upon an area marked by a number of small oil slicks. Wainwright chose the most promising of the slicks and dropped four depth charges. She then commenced another fruitless search which ended at midnight when she received orders to return to Queenstown.

Wainwright continued to operate out of Queenstown until June 1918 when she was reassigned to United States naval forces in France. On the 8th, she reported for duty at Brest, the French port from which she conducted her patrols for the remainder of the war. Those patrols brought no further encounters with the enemy. Only two events of note occurred between June and November 1918. On the night of 19/20 October, she sighted what appeared to be a submarine running on the surface. However, upon closer inspection, the object proved to be a derelict carrying the crew of the 77-ton Portuguese schooner Aida, which had been captured by German submarine  and sunk with explosive charges. Wainwright took on the survivors and saw them safely into port. Later, during the evening of 1 November, heavy winds at Brest caused the destroyer to drag anchor: and she struck the breakwater. After  had failed to pull her loose, the tug  took over and finally managed to refloat the warship at 19:20 and towed her into Brest.

Hostilities ended on 11 November 1918, and Wainwright returned home early in 1919 to resume duty with the Atlantic Fleet destroyers. She operated along the east coast and in the Caribbean until 19 May 1922 when she was decommissioned at Philadelphia, Pennsylvania. The destroyer remained in reserve until the spring of 1926.

Coast Guard career 

On 17 January 1920, Prohibition was instituted by law in the United States. Soon, the smuggling of alcoholic beverages along the coastlines of the United States became widespread and blatant. The Treasury Department eventually determined that the United States Coast Guard simply did not have the ships to constitute a successful patrol. To cope with the problem, President Calvin Coolidge in 1924 authorized the transfer from the Navy to the Coast Guard of twenty old destroyers that were in reserve and out of commission. Wainwright was activated and acquired by the Coast Guard on 2 April 1926, as part of a second group of five to augment the original twenty.

Wainwright moved to Boston on 22 May and remained there until 27 July when she got underway for the Connecticut coast. She reached New London, two days later; and, on the 30th, she was commissioned by the Coast Guard. The warship retained her name while serving with the Coast Guard's "Rum Patrol" to suppress the illegal importation of alcoholic beverages. She served at New London from the summer of 1926 until 1929. On 4 January 1929, she headed south to Charleston, South Carolina, whence she conducted gunnery practice until 4 February when she returned north to Boston. In January 1930, she headed south again for gunnery practice but this time at St. Petersburg, Florida. During each of the two succeeding years—in January 1931 and late in March 1932—she returned to St. Petersburg for a month of target practice and afterward resumed her duties along the New England coast.

In May 1933, her permanent duty station was changed to New York, and she reported there at the end of the first week in June. After a summer of normal operations, the warship began target practice at Hampton Roads, on 7 September.

U.S. Navy duty in Cuba
That duty, however, was interrupted on the 9th by orders to report for duty with the Navy in the area of the Florida Strait during the series of revolts in Cuba which finally resulted in the beginning of Fulgencio Batista's 25-year rule. On 6 November, Wainwright was released from duty with the Navy and was ordered back to New York.

Return to Coast Guard duty
Wainwright arrived three days later and resumed duties with the Coast Guard until March 1934. On the 14th, she departed the station at Stapleton, New York, and arrived in Philadelphia the following day. She was decommissioned by the Coast Guard on 29 March.

Return to Navy, decommissioning, and disposal
On 27 April, the Commandant, 4th Naval District, took possession of Wainwright for the Navy. Her name was reinstated on the Navy list briefly but was struck once again on 5 July 1934. On 22 August, she was sold to Michael Flynn, Inc., of Brooklyn, New York, for scrapping.

Notes

References

Bibliography

External links 
 

 

Tucker-class destroyers
Ships built by New York Shipbuilding Corporation
1915 ships
World War I destroyers of the United States
Ships of the United States Coast Guard
Ships transferred from the United States Navy to the United States Coast Guard